Flat spot is a rail transport fault.

Flat spot may also refer to:

Flat spot (automobile), one of two possible automobile faults
Flat spot (reflection seismology), a reflection seismology attribute anomaly